Jinniushan is a Middle Pleistocene paleoanthropological site, dating to around 260,000 BP, most famous for its archaic hominin fossils. The site is located near Yingkou, Liaoning, China. Several new species of extinct birds were also discovered at the site.

Jinniushan hominin
The hominid fossils at Jinniushan all belong to one individual. Initially, the fossils were believed to have belonged to a male specimen, since the fossils were so big.  Later analysis shows that the fossil remains actually come from a female specimen.

Size

Body size in Homo reached its maximum during the Middle Pleistocene, so the size of the Jinniushan specimen is not surprising, especially since the specimen was found at a high latitude, cold climate location. In accordance with Allen's rule and Bergmann's rule, the large body, wide trunk, and short limbs of the Jinniushan female is to be expected, as the hominins from that time relied more on their physical body as a cold adaptation, as their technological culture was not yet as advanced as later hominins.

Description
The fossil elements at Jinniushan all belong to one female individual. The fossil remains consist of one cranium, six vertebrae (one cervical, five thoracic), one complete left os coxae, one complete left ulna, one complete left patella, two left ribs, and several hand and feet bones.

Comparison

The Jinniushan specimen belongs to an archaic human with mixed Homo erectus and Homo sapiens features.

The Jinniushan specimen is similar to the Dali specimen, but more gracile, which can be explained by sexual dimorphism. The cranial vault and supraorbitals of the Jinniushan specimen are thinner than those of the Dali specimen. Jinniushan's external cranium is the same size as Dali's, but Jinniushan's bones are thinner, so the Jinniushan specimen has a larger brain capacity than the Dali specimen.

Both specimens have flat and broad faces, a feature shared with the specimen from Hulu Cave, Nanjing; both also share some features with the Zhoukoudian and Yunxian specimens.

Morphologically, archaic female and Neanderthal females are more similar to modern females than their male counterparts are to modern males. The similar morphologies imply that the birth mechanics of the Jinniushan hominin is probably similar to that of modern females.

Cranial capacity
The encephalization quotient (EQ) is estimated to be around 4.150. Both are typical of the rapidly increasing brain capacity and EQ found in other specimens from the Middle Pleistocene.

Fauna
Macaca robustus, Trogontherium, Megaloceros pachyosteus, Dicerorhinus mercki, and Microtus brandtioides fossils were found at Jinniushan. Several new species of extinct birds were also discovered, including Aegypius jinniushanensis and Leptoptilos lüi.

References

Bibliography

Paleoanthropological sites
Paleolithic sites in China
Major National Historical and Cultural Sites in Liaoning
Yingkou